John Shane (26 May 1822 – 18 September 1899) was an American politician, judge, and military officer.

A native of Jefferson County, Ohio, Shane was born on 26 May 1822. After graduating from Jefferson College in Pennsylvania, Shane studied law under Edwin M. Stanton. In 1856, Shane settled in Vinton, Iowa, and established the Alexander,
Shane & McCartney law firm. As the American Civil War broke out, Shane listed in Company G of the 13th Iowa Infantry Regiment. He saw action at the Battle of Shiloh and during the Atlanta campaign. Shane began his military career with the rank of captain, and retired as a colonel, having attained the rank as Marcellus M. Crocker was elevated to brigadier general.

He returned to the practice of law in Vinton, and was elected to the Iowa Senate as a Republican from District 33 in 1871. Shane won a second term as state senator in 1875, and was redistricted to District 28 before the 1877 election. Shane chose to accept an 1876 gubernatorial nomination to serve as a judge for the eighth judicial district of Iowa, in which he replaced James H. Rothrock as Rothrock was elevated to the Iowa Supreme Court. Shane was succeeded in the state senate by John David Nichols of District 28, and William Harrison Gallup in District 33. Shane was elected to a full term as judge in 1878, and elected to resign the position in 1882 due to paralysis. He died on 18 September 1899 in Vinton.

References

1899 deaths
1822 births
Washington & Jefferson College alumni
19th-century American judges
People from Jefferson County, Ohio
Iowa state court judges
Republican Party Iowa state senators
19th-century American lawyers
People of Iowa in the American Civil War
People from Vinton, Iowa